The Curtis Counce Group (later released as Landslide) is an album by American jazz bassist Curtis Counce recorded in 1956 and released on the Contemporary label.

Reception
The Allmusic review by Scott Yanow states "All of Counce's recordings (which include a slightly later album for Dootone) are well worth getting by collectors interested in 1950s straight-ahead jazz. This disc is an excellent place to start".

Track listing
 "Landslide" (Harold Land) - 8:39
 "Time After Time" (Sammy Cahn, Jule Styne) - 6:35
 "Sonar" (Kenny Clarke, Gerald Wiggins) - 7:28
 "Mia" (Carl Perkins) - 4:59
 "Sarah" (Jack Sheldon) - 11:40
 "A Fifth for Frank" (Wiggins, Cal Tjader) - 7:11

Personnel
Curtis Counce - bass
Jack Sheldon - trumpet
Harold Land - tenor saxophone
Carl Perkins - piano
Frank Butler - drums

References

Contemporary Records albums
Curtis Counce albums
1957 albums